The Lyons in Paris (also called The Lyons Abroad and Mr. and Mrs. in Paree) is a 1955 British comedy film directed by Val Guest and starring Ben Lyon, Bebe Daniels and Reginald Beckwith. It was a sequel to the 1954 film Life with the Lyons, and was shot at Southall Studios, though some genuine Paris location shots were used.

Plot
Has Ben Lyon forgotten his wedding anniversary? His wife Bebe thinks he has, and can hardly contain her fury. When his son Richard sees him dining with a glamorous French singer he thinks the worst. But Ben is actually buying tickets from her, and he surprises everyone with a family holiday to Paris. Once in Paris, there are further misunderstandings involving the singer, trouble with an antique car, as well as visits to a seedy nightclub and to the famous Folies Bergère.

Cast
 Ben Lyon as Ben
 Bebe Daniels as Bebe
 Barbara Lyon as Barbara
 Richard Lyon as Richard
 Reginald Beckwith as Captain le Grand
 Horace Percival as Mr. Wimple
 Molly Weir as Aggie
 Hugh Morton as Colonel Price

Critical reception
David McGillivray wrote in the Radio Times, "director Val Guest maintains a brisk pace, and the Lyons are really rather endearing."

References

External links

1955 films
1955 comedy films
British comedy films
1950s English-language films
Films directed by Val Guest
Films based on radio series
Films shot at Southall Studios
Films set in Paris
British sequel films
Hammer Film Productions films
1950s British films
British black-and-white films